Majala is a village in Võru Parish, Võru County in southern Estonia. 1991–2017 this village belonged to Sõmerpalu Parish.

As of 2019 there lives 10 people.

References

 

Villages in Võru County